María León may refer to:

 María León (basketball) (born 1967), Cuban former basketball player
 María León (actress) (born 1984), Spanish actress
 María Teresa León (1903–1988), Spanish writer, activist and cultural ambassador
 María Pilar León (born 1995), Spanish footballer